Tanner Buchanan (born December 8, 1998) is an American actor. He is best known for his roles as Leo Kirkman in the ABC political drama Designated Survivor and Robby Keene in the Netflix series Cobra Kai. He is also known for his role in the Nickelodeon television series Game Shakers as Mason Kendall.

Career
In 2010, he made his first appearance on television, playing a child role in the Modern Family series. Three years later he appeared in Grey's Anatomy, Major Crimes, and The Goldbergs. He had recurring roles on Girl Meets World, Game Shakers, and The Fosters. In 2016, he played his first main role on television, playing Leo Kirkman in the political drama series Designated Survivor. In 2018, he began playing Johnny Lawrence's estranged son Robby Keene in the YouTube Premium (and later Netflix) series Cobra Kai. He also starred in the remake of She's All That called He's All That.

Filmography

Film

Television

References

External links

 

1998 births
Living people
American male child actors
American male film actors
American male television actors
21st-century American male actors
Male actors from Ohio
People from Lima, Ohio